Marcel "Max" Mamers (born 26 May 1943 in Objat) is a French former racing driver.

References

1943 births
Living people
French racing drivers
24 Hours of Le Mans drivers
Sportspeople from Corrèze
20th-century French people